Juan Pablo Varillas was the defending champion but lost in the quarterfinals to Marcelo Tomás Barrios Vera.

Sebastián Báez won the title after defeating Felipe Meligeni Alves 3–6, 7–6(8–6), 6–1 in the final.

Seeds

Draw

Finals

Top half

Bottom half

References

External links
Main draw
Qualifying draw

Challenger de Santiago III - 1
2021 Singles